The Helbé was a French automobile manufactured from 1905 until 1907; it received its name, a version of "LB", from the initials of its builder, Levêcque and Bodenreider.  It was an assembled light car, powered by De Dion engines of 4½, 6, and 8 hp, and used Delage components.

References

Defunct motor vehicle manufacturers of France